Fawzia Afzal-Khan  (born 1958 in Lahore, Pakistan) is a professor of English and director of the Women and Gender Studies Program at Montclair State University. Afzal-Khan received her BA from Kinnaird College for Women, Lahore, Pakistan, and her MA and PhD in English Literature from Tufts University. A University Distinguished Professor, Afzal-Khan was awarded The "Excellence in Public Life Award" by the American Muslim Alliance in 2008. Afzal-Khan also serves on the editorial board of Pakistaniaat: A Journal of Pakistan Studies.

Scholarly work 
Author of three monographs and two edited volumes, Afzal-Khan has published extensively in academic journals as well as in newspapers and on public blogs on issues related to postcolonial studies, feminism, and political Islam.

Memoir: Lahore with Love 
Afzal-Khan's memoir, Lahore with Love: Growing up with Girlfriends Pakistani Style, was published in 2010 by Syracuse University Press. The memoir was immediately received as a fine contribution to the women's rights issues in Pakistan. The first edition contained commending blurbs from prominent authors and scholars: Nawal El Saadawi called it a "beautiful memoir which challenges stereotypes, universal fanatic fundamentalism and religious, political, and sexual taboos" and Henry Louis Gates Jr. found it to be a memoir that "weaves together memory and desire to create a tale that is marvelously compelling and endlessly entertaining, at once poignantly personal and richly political."

However, despite its positive reception, the book was soon dropped by Syracuse University Press due to the fear of a lawsuit from a prominent Pakistani woman who claimed that a character depicted in the book was based on her. The cancellation of the book by an academic press for fear of a lawsuit became an important issue in academic circles. Since the cancellation of the book, various academics, writers, and editors have supported Afzal-Khan in her right to free speech. In an editorial, Richard Schechner and Katherine Lieder of The Drama Review castigated the Syracuse University Press for not standing up for the rights of free speech of one of their own authors.

Afzal-Khan has now published the memoir independently through the Amazon publishing platform. In 2011, Pakistaniaat: A Journal of Pakistan Studies published a special cluster of articles about the book, along with an interview with Afzal-Khan about the controversy. Pakistaniaat had previously published an interview with Fawzia in 2009, which was conducted by Nilanshu Kumar Agarwal.

Bibliography

References

External links 
 Montclair State Faculty Profile
 Lahore with Love
  Interview

Pakistani academics
Pakistani educational theorists
Pakistani literary critics
Pakistani women literary critics
Living people
1958 births
Montclair State University faculty
Tufts University School of Arts and Sciences alumni
Kinnaird College for Women University alumni
People from Lahore
Pakistani expatriates in the United States